The Kia Granbird is a high-decker coach produced by the South Korean manufacturer Kia. It was derived from the Hino S'elega platform and for a brief period of time from former Asia Motors. Production started in 1994, and the exterior look stayed the same until the second generation in 2007, and then finally a refresh in 2020. The Granbird is manufactured at Kia's Gwangju plant, which also makes the Soul, Sportage, Rondo, and Kia's commercial and military trucks. The Granbird is only sold in selected markets.

First Generation (1994–2007)
In 1994, Kia introduced the Granbird, to compete with the Hyundai Aero and the Daewoo BH series. This generation was only offered with direct injection diesel engines.

Second Generation (2007–2020)
In 2007, the second generation Granbird was introduced with the Parkway model. The Granbird and the Hyundai Universe shared a dedicated commercial vehicle chassis. It underwent a first refresh in 2011. The second refresh of the Granbird, the Silkroad model, debuted at the Seoul Motor Show in 2015.

Model Name
Silkroad
Sunshine
Bluesky
Parkway
Greenfield

3rd Generation (2020–Present)

Unveiled on 14 May 2020, the 3rd Generation  Kia Granbird continues to be underpinned by Hyundai's dedicated commercial vehicle chassis shared with the refreshed Hyundai Universe. It is available in Super Premium Sunshine and Super Premium Parkway trims. It features a large, completely color instrument cluster, and a large touchscreen infotainment system. The interior also features a new flat TV and an entertainment system is standard on the Super Premium Sunshine and Super Premium Parkway versions. The indoor height has been increased by 80mm, and the upper left and right widths of the interior have been expanded by 120mm.

For the first time in its class, a front parking assist device that sounds a warning sound when there is an obstacle in the lower front, a steering haptic that gives attention to the driver through vibration when operating with safety specifications, and automatically opens the door through a sensor when a person or object gets caught when the door is closed. The main entrance touch sensor, a speed-sensitive car height control device that adjusts the height of the vehicle according to the vehicle speed to improve aerodynamic performance, etc., are applied.

The powertrain of the refreshed coach is a Powertech 12.7-liter Hyundai D6CG (Euro 6) (440ps) diesel engine paired to both manual and automatic transmissions.

See also 

 List of buses

External links
Chronological table of Korean Buses
 (South Korea) 

Granbird
Buses
Coaches (bus)